Chi Cheng (born March 15, 1944 in Hsinchu, Japanese Taiwan) is a Taiwanese track and field athlete. She was an Olympic medalist in 1968 and was named the Associated Press Athlete of the Year for 1970. She was a former pentathlete turned sprinter.

Biography

Chi studied on the college level at the California State Polytechnic University, Pomona (Cal Poly Pomona) in Pomona, California, where she received most of her athletic training. As a student there, she won four U.S. national championships and over a two-year period was the winner of 153 of the 154 events she entered. Representing the Republic of China, she ran in the 1960 and 1964 Olympics, then won the bronze medal in the women's 80-meter hurdles in the 1968 Summer Olympics and finished 7th in the 100 metre final. 

In 1969, she broke three world records. In 1970, she broke or tied five world records, accomplishing 3 in the space of just one week. She was first woman to run 10.0 second for 100 yards. She also ran world bests of 11.0 for 100 metres, 22.4 for 200 metres, 22.6 for 220 yards, and 12.8 for 100 metre hurdles. She won the gold medal in the 100 metres at the Asian Games in Bangkok in a games record time. While leading in the 400 metres at the Asian Games when she suffered a severe leg cramp at 330 metres, which eventually led to a career ending injury. She was ranked number one in the world for 100 metres and 200 metres, second in the 400 metres and third in 100 metres hurdles in 1970 and was undefeated in 69 races that season. 

For her achievement, Chi Cheng was named the Associated Press Athlete of the Year. Also, she became the Director of Women's Athletics at the University of Redlands, California, from 1974 to 1976.

Chi naturalised as a U.S. citizen, but later returned to Taiwan. She was appointed the Secretary-General of the Republic of China Track and Field Association in 1977. Subsequently, she was Chairman until 1993 and Board Member from 1998 to 1999. Chi won three terms as a member of the Legislative Yuan, serving from 1981 to 1989. 

She was appointed a National Policy Advisor by President Ma Ying-jeou in 2009, which required her to renounce her U.S. citizenship in order to take the position. Ma's successor, Tsai Ing-wen, retained Chi as an advisor. 

Chi stated in 2018 that Taiwanese people should be allowed to vote for the name under which Taiwanese athletes compete in the 2020 Summer Olympics and future sports events, as Taiwanese as sent delegations to the Olympics since 1984 as Chinese Taipei.

References

External links
 
 
 

1944 births
Living people
Taiwanese female long jumpers
Taiwanese female sprinters
Taiwanese female hurdlers
Taiwanese pentathletes
Taiwanese sportsperson-politicians
20th-century Taiwanese women politicians
Asian Games gold medalists for Chinese Taipei
Asian Games silver medalists for Chinese Taipei
Asian Games medalists in athletics (track and field)
Athletes (track and field) at the 1966 Asian Games
Athletes (track and field) at the 1970 Asian Games
Olympic athletes of Taiwan
Olympic bronze medalists for Taiwan
Athletes (track and field) at the 1960 Summer Olympics
Athletes (track and field) at the 1964 Summer Olympics
Athletes (track and field) at the 1968 Summer Olympics
Kuomintang Members of the Legislative Yuan in Taiwan
Members of the 1st Legislative Yuan in Taiwan
Taipei Members of the Legislative Yuan
Politicians of the Republic of China on Taiwan from Hsinchu
Cal Poly Pomona Broncos
Taiwanese emigrants to the United States
Former United States citizens
American female sprinters
Medalists at the 1968 Summer Olympics
Olympic bronze medalists in athletics (track and field)
American female long jumpers
Medalists at the 1966 Asian Games
Medalists at the 1970 Asian Games
Senior Advisors to President Ma Ying-jeou
Senior Advisors to President Tsai Ing-wen
USA Outdoor Track and Field Championships winners
USA Indoor Track and Field Championships winners